Falakiko Manu (born 11 May 1997) is a professional rugby league footballer who plays as a  or er for the Wynnum Manly Seagulls in the Hostplus Cup.

He previously played for the Canterbury-Bankstown Bulldogs in the NRL.

Playing career
In round 16 of the 2021 NRL season, Manu made his debut for Canterbury-Bankstown against the Manly-Warringah Sea Eagles where Canterbury suffered a 66–0 defeat.

On 31 August 2021, Manu was one of twelve players who were told by Canterbury that they would not be offered a contract for the 2022 season and would be released at season's end.

References

External links
Canterbury Bulldogs profile

1997 births
Living people
Canterbury-Bankstown Bulldogs players
New Zealand rugby league players
Rugby league centres
Rugby league players from Auckland
Wynnum Manly Seagulls players